Valdesoto Club de Fútbol is a Spanish football club based in Valdesoto, Siero, in the autonomous community of Asturias.

History
Founded in 1961, Valdesoto played most of their years in the first tier of the Asturian regional leagues. Its colors, red and blue, were chosen to avoid problems with the local fans of Sporting de Gijón and Real Oviedo, the two main teams in Asturias. In its second season, the club achieved the title of the old Copa Federación and its first promotion arrived in 1964.

In 1993, Valdesoto promoted for the first time to Tercera División thanks to the promotion of UP Langreo to Segunda División B.

After its relegation in 2002, Valdesoto played always in Regional Preferente until 2017, when it promoted again to Tercera, like in the first time, thanks to the promotion of an Asturian team to the third tier, this time Sporting de Gijón B.

Valdesoto only could remain in Tercera one season, but two years after their relegation, the club promoted again to Tercera División. It did it after the suspension of the league due to the COVID-19 pandemic.

Season to season

6 seasons in Tercera División

References

External links
Profile at Jugadores Segunda B

Siero
Football clubs in Asturias
Association football clubs established in 1961
1961 establishments in Spain